Kenji Miyamoto may refer to:

 Kenji Miyamoto (politician) (1908–2007), Japanese politician
 Kenji Miyamoto (figure skater) (born 1978), Japanese retired ice dancer